Albert Edward Anson (14 September 1879 – 25 June 1936) was a  British stage and screen actor.
Born in London, he made his first appearance onstage in 1895. He left the stage briefly to pursue a degree in engineering and returned to appear with Beerbohm Tree's company in 1904. He gained fame as a Shakespearian actor appearing on London and New York stages.

In 1931, Anson made his screen debut in John Ford's film Arrowsmith. Director Frank Capra cast him to play the "High Lama" in his film Lost Horizon, but Anson died before filming so the role was given to Sam Jaffe. 

Anson died on 25 June 1936, in Monrovia, California, and was buried in the Hollywood Forever Cemetery in Los Angeles.

Stage career
His father was the Shakespearean and character actor George W. Anson.

His stage debut was at the Court Theatre in London on 27 April 1895. In 1904 (like his father at around this time) he joined Herbert Beerbohm Tree's company. In 1905 he played Brabantio in Othello, his first major role.

In 1905 he toured the US: he appeared in the play The Toast of the Town by Clyde Fitch, with Viola Allen and Hassard Short.

He first appeared in New York in 1902, in Shakespeare's Julius Caesar.

As a member of the New Theatre Company, which included many English actors, he was in the first play produced in the New Theatre in New York, opening on 6 November 1909, playing Octavian in Shakespeare's Antony and Cleopatra, and was in Galsworthy's Strife, opening on 17 November. The company produced Shakespeare's The Merry Wives of Windsor, which opened on 7 November 1910, Anson playing Master Ford. This last play came in December 1910 to Toronto, where a reviewer wrote, "Mr. Anson was especially fine as the jealous husband Ford. Indeed his was a performance that deepened the significance of the play."

He was in The Witness for the Defence by A. E. W. Mason, which ran for 64 performances at the Empire Theatre, opening in December 1911. This came to Toronto, where the same reviewer wrote, "Mr. A. E. Anson... is known to be one of the most eloquent actors of the day – a man much of the type of Sir George Alexander, the possessor of a beautiful voice and the bearing of a person of distinction as he is supposed to be in the play."

The play Romance by Edward Sheldon, in which Anson played Cornelius van Tuyl, ran for 160 performances in 1913 at the Maxine Elliott Theatre. A critic wrote, "Mr. Anson's complete command of the resources of his art is a treat to all lovers of acting, and his suave ease upon the stage a thing to be copied by many a player." In London, Romance opened at the Duke of York's Theatre on 6 October 1915; Anson, who produced the play, appeared again as van Tuyl. The play ran for 1,049 performances.

Back in New York, he reprised the role of van Tuyl in the 1921 revival of Romance at the Playhouse Theatre, where it ran for 106 performances.

He was in the play White Cargo, which ran for 257 performances at the Greenwich Village Theatre, opening in November 1923, Anson playing Witzel. The play was written and staged by Leon Gordon. (It was made into a film in 1942.)

He married three times: to actress Cora Busch in 1902 (their daughter Cora Marjorie Viola Anson was born in 1906) and they divorced in 1912; to actress Deirdre Doyle in 1912, they were later divorced; thirdly to actress Mary Malleson, with whom he appeared in New York in The Barton Mystery by Walter C. Hackett in 1917; he also directed this play. During the 1920s he was engaged to, but did not marry, the actress Marjorie Rambeau with whom he was in two New York productions: As You Like It in 1923, and The Road Together (which closed after one performance) by George Middleton in 1924.

Movies

In the 1930s he moved to California. He appeared in the 1931 film Arrowsmith, directed by John Ford. The film was based on the novel “ Arrowsmith” by Sinclair Lewis, about the life of Martin Arrowsmith, an idealistic doctor (played by Ronald Colman); Anson played the part of his mentor Dr Gottlieb.
Anson had a minor part in the 1931  William Powell romantic drama The Road to Singapore, directed by Alfred E. Green and based on the play Heatwave by Denise Robins and Roland Pertwee.

References

External links

 

1879 births
1936 deaths
English male film actors
English male stage actors
Burials at Hollywood Forever Cemetery
20th-century English male actors
British expatriate male actors in the United States